Borsboom is a Dutch surname. It is a hypercorrected form of the toponymic surname Bosboom, meaning "forest tree".

Notable people with these surnames include:
Borsboom
Denny Borsboom (born 1973), Dutch psychologist
Matthieu Borsboom (born 1959), Dutch naval officer
Bosboom
Anna Louisa Geertruida Bosboom-Toussaint (1812–1886), Dutch novelist
Johannes Bosboom (1817–1891), Dutch painter and watercolorist
Simon Bosboom (1614–1662), Dutch painter
Tea Bosboom-Lanchava (born 1974), Dutch-Georgian chess player

See also
:nl:Bosboom

References

Dutch-language surnames
Toponymic surnames